The Royal Lyceum was a small theatre in York Street, Sydney founded in 1854, which was redeveloped and renamed many times, finally as the Queen's Theatre, by which name it closed in 1882.

History 
In the late 1840s Malcom's Royal Australian Circus (later Amphitheatre) opened on the west side of York Street, Sydney between King and Market streets. The venue specialised in equestrian displays and trick riding, tightrope dancing and "Olympic games". John Malcom was the proprietor.

It was refurbished and reopened in October 1854 as the Royal Lyceum Theatre, perhaps named after the theatre in Edinburgh, and frequently referred to as "the Lyceum". 
Its first lessees were the American C. R. Thorne company, who were previously at the Victoria Theatre.

Not two years later, the theatre was taken over by W. H. Stephens and H. T. Craven, who refurbished its interior and in July 1856 renamed it and the hotel adjacent as "Our Lyceum".
Improvements included a clerestory roof for better ventilation, boxes that gave a better view of the stage, and an enlarged orchestra pit.
There was however a slump in stage productions and the theatre was mostly used for public meetings.
Stephens was forced to declare insolvency.
In 1866 the Lyceum, or "New Lyceum" with another renovation and new lessee Frank Towers, was reckoned one of three or four good theatres in Sydney (along with the Prince of Wales in Castlereagh Street, the Victoria Theatre in Pitt Street and, intermittently, the Opera House) but was "seldom open".
In 1867 it became the Alexandra Hall, an assembly hall or salon de danse.

In 1869 the partnership of Harding, Wilson and Habbe took over management, renovating and decorating the interior, renaming it the Theatre Royal Adelphi.

In 1873 it was renovated and renamed the Queen's Theatre under management of W. B. Gill, after which it became a café chantant, to Punchs chagrin. then refurbished by Samuel Lazar and reopened in March 1875, to Mr Punch's evident approval. J. C. Williamson and Maggie Moore played Struck Oil at "The Queen's" in March, 1875.

In July 1877 C. Wheatleigh, took over management of the Queen's Theatre and scored several successes in Around the World in 80 days and The Shaughran. 
L. M. Bayless followed as manager a few months later, with the Simonsen company and the opera Giroflé-Girofla.
Licensee of the Queen's Hotel adjacent was the boxer Larry Foley.

In July 1882 the Queen's Theatre was closed by Government order, as being unsafe.
It was used by a commercial interest for some years, then demolished sometime before 1905.

 The new Lyceum 
On 26 December 1892 a new theatre opened between Park and Market streets on Pitt Street, which was named "Lyceum", sometimes referred to as the New Lyceum''', and marked the reunion of the J. C. Williamson and George Musgrove interests, in presenting the pantomime Little Red Riding Hood''.

It became a cinema, "Spencer's Pictures" in 1908.

Notes

References

External links
A Short History of the Royal Lyceum Theatre, York St Sydney includes drawings and maps

Former theatres in Sydney
Theatres completed in 1854
1854 establishments in Australia
1882 disestablishments in Australia